Carlos Raymundo Toledo (born 8 February 1954) is a Mexican politician from the National Action Party. From 2000 to 2003 he served as Deputy of the LVIII Legislature of the Mexican Congress representing Chiapas, and previously served as municipal president of Huixtla.

References

1954 births
Living people
Politicians from Chiapas
National Action Party (Mexico) politicians
20th-century Mexican politicians
21st-century Mexican politicians
National Autonomous University of Mexico alumni
Municipal presidents in Chiapas
Deputies of the LVIII Legislature of Mexico
Members of the Chamber of Deputies (Mexico) for Chiapas